I Could Never Have Sex with Any Man Who Has So Little Regard for My Husband is a 1973 American sex comedy film directed by Robert McCarty, from a screenplay by Dan Greenburg, based on his 1968 novel Chewsday. The film stars Carmine Caridi, Andrew Duncan, Cynthia Harris, and Lynne Lipton.

Synopsis
Two middle-aged pairs of aspiring swingers rent a summer cottage in Martha's Vineyard, Massachusetts. They sit around discussing the pros and cons of having affairs.

Cast
 Carmine Caridi as Marvin
 Andrew Duncan as Stanley
 Cynthia Harris as Laura
 Lynne Lipton as Mandy
 Dan Greenburg as Herb
 Gail Stayden as Barbara DeVroom
 Martin Stayden as Tony DeVroom

References

External links
 
 
 
 

1973 films
1973 comedy films
1973 independent films
1970s sex comedy films
1970s English-language films
American independent films
American sex comedy films
Films about adultery in the United States
Films about couples
Films based on American novels
Films set in Martha's Vineyard
Films shot in Martha's Vineyard
1970s American films